Rodney Elton, 2nd Baron Elton (born 2 March 1930), is a British Conservative politician and former member of the House of Lords.

Biography
Elton is the son of Godfrey Elton, 1st Baron Elton. He was educated at Eton College and New College, Oxford, and succeeded to the peerage on his father's death in 1973. Between 1964 and 1967, he was a master at Loughborough Grammar School.

On the formation of a Conservative government after the 1979 general election, Elton was made a Parliamentary Under Secretary of State at the Northern Ireland Office. In 1981 he was moved to the Department of Health and Social Security and in 1982 to the Home Office. In 1984 he was promoted to Minister of State within the Home Office. In 1985, Elton joined the Department of Environment, again as a Minister of State, but left the government the following year.

With the passage of the House of Lords Act 1999, Elton along with other hereditary peers lost his automatic right to sit in the House of Lords. He was, however, elected as one of the ninety hereditary peers allowed to remain in the House pending completion of House of Lords reform. Elton was a candidate to become Lord Speaker in the elections that took place at the end of June 2006, but he was defeated, Baroness Hayman ultimately winning. He retired from the House of Lords on 29 October 2020; a by-election to replace him was held 13–14 July 2021, which Lord Harlech was elected to succeed him.

Marriages and children
Elton was married to Anne Frances Tilney, daughter of Brigadier Robert Tilney, on 18 September 1958. They had four children:

 Hon. Annabel Elton (born 24 October 1960)
 Hon. Jane Elton (born 15 January 1962)
 Hon. Lucy Elton (born 19 December 1963)
 Hon. Edward Paget Elton (born 28 May 1966), heir apparent to the barony

Following a divorce in 1979, on 24 August 1979 Elton married Susan Richenda Gurney (born 1937), daughter of Hugh Gurney and a granddaughter of Lancelot Carnegie. There are no children of this marriage. Richenda was a Lady of the Bedchamber to Elizabeth II until The Queen’s death in 2022.

Styles
2 March 1930 – 16 January 1934: Rodney Elton
16 January 1934 – 18 April 1973: The Honourable Rodney Elton
18 April 1973 – present: The Right Honourable The Lord Elton

Coat of arms

References

External links
Ministerial posts 

1930 births
Living people
People educated at Eton College
Alumni of New College, Oxford
Barons in the Peerage of the United Kingdom
Conservative Party (UK) hereditary peers
Northern Ireland Office junior ministers
British people of Norwegian descent
Hereditary peers elected under the House of Lords Act 1999